Kobela may refer to:

Kobéla, town and sub-prefecture in Nzérékoré Prefecture, Nzérékoré Region, Guinea
Kobela, Estonia, settlement in Antsla Parish, Võru County, Estonia
Calleagris kobela,  butterfly of the family Hesperiidae, also known as Mrs Raven flat and Mrs Raven skipper